Anna Carmen Schell (born 3 August 1993) is a German freestyle wrestler. She is a two-time bronze medalist at the World Wrestling Championships and a two-time medalist, including gold, at the European Wrestling Championships. She also represented Germany at the 2020 Summer Olympics in Tokyo, Japan.

Career 

In 2017, she lost her bronze medal match against Svetlana Saenko of Moldova in the 75 kg event at the European Wrestling Championships held in Novi Sad, Serbia. In 2018, she competed in the 68 kg event at the World Wrestling Championships held in Budapest, Hungary where she was eliminated in her first match by Blessing Oborududu of Nigeria.

In 2019, she also won the silver medal in the 72 kg event at the European Wrestling Championships held in Bucharest, Romania. In 2020, she competed in the 68 kg event without winning a medal. She lost her bronze medal match against Danutė Domikaitytė of Lithuania.

At the 2019 World Wrestling Championships held in Nur-Sultan, Kazakhstan, she won one of the bronze medals in the 68 kg event.

She competed in the 68 kg event at the 2020 Summer Olympics in Tokyo, Japan where she was eliminated in her second match by eventual bronze medalist Alla Cherkasova of Ukraine. Two months after the Olympics, she won one of the bronze medals in the 72 kg event at the 2021 World Wrestling Championships in Oslo, Norway. In her bronze medal match she defeated Enkh-Amaryn Davaanasan of Mongolia.

In 2022, she won the silver medal in the 72 kg event at the Yasar Dogu Tournament held in Istanbul, Turkey. In April 2022, she won the gold medal in the 72 kg event at the European Wrestling Championships held in Budapest, Hungary. A few months later, she won the silver medal in her event at the Matteo Pellicone Ranking Series 2022 held in Rome, Italy.

Achievements

References

External links 

 

Living people
1993 births
Place of birth missing (living people)
German female sport wrestlers
World Wrestling Championships medalists
European Wrestling Championships medalists
Wrestlers at the 2020 Summer Olympics
Olympic wrestlers of Germany
European Wrestling Champions
21st-century German women